The Italy national short track team represents Italy in International short track competitions such as Olympic Games or World Short Track Speed Skating Championships and World Short Track Speed Skating Team Championships.

Olympic Games

World Team Championships

World Championships

Medallists

See also
Short track speed skating at the Winter Olympics

References

External links
Short Track Speed Skating World Championships – Team – Men – Updated to Nobeyama 2001
Short Track Speed Skating World Championships – Relay – Men – Updated to Jeonju City 2001

Short track
Italy